Go Back may refer to:

Music
 Go Back (album) or the title song, by Titãs, 1988
 "Go Back" (Chalee Tennison song), 2000
 "Go Back" (Jeanette song), 2000
 "Go Back", a song by Crabby Appleton, 1970
 "Go Back", a song by Leah Daniels, 2014

Other uses
 Go-back, a retail item that must be placed back on the shelves
 Go-Back, a fictional tribe of elves in the comic book series ElfQuest
 GoBack, a recovery utility for Microsoft Windows

See also
 "Goobacks", a 2004 episode of the TV series South Park